Dollar Lakes are a group of three glacial tarns in the Ruby Mountains of Elko County, Nevada, United States. They are within the Ruby Mountains Ranger District of the Humboldt-Toiyabe National Forest. The Ruby Crest National Recreation Trail runs along the western shore of the lakes.

Dollar and Lamoille lakes are the principal sources of Lamoille Creek, which after exiting the mountains passes through the town of Lamoille, meanders down Lamoille Valley, and then merges with the main branch of the Humboldt River.

References

Ruby Mountains
Lakes of Nevada
Lakes of Elko County, Nevada
Lakes of the Great Basin
Humboldt–Toiyabe National Forest